Jotnar is a Spanish melodic death metal band founded in Las Palmas de Gran Canaria (Canary Islands) in 2008. Their first release was the 2012 five-track EP Giant which was released via the Italian record label Coroner Records. During the same year, Jotnar performed in international metal festivals like Metalcamp 2012 (Slovenia) and "RockBitch Boat 2012" (Sweden).

In 2015, vocalist Misael Montesdeoca left the band and was replaced by Mario Infantes from the band Denia. The band's debut album Connected/Condemned was released in April 2017 via Massacre Records.

Current members 
 Mario Infantes – vocals
 Ben Melero – guitars
 Elhadji N'Diaye – guitars & backing vocals
 Octavio Santana – bass guitar
 Jose Rodriguez – drums

Discography

EP 
 Giant (Coroner Records/Murdered Music) – 2012

Full-length 
 Connected/Condemned (Massacre Records) – 2017

Music videos 
 I Am Giant (Director's cut) – 2012
 Perfect Lie (Lyric video) – 2013
 In Process (Live video) – 2014
 Connected/Condemned – 2016
 Broken Esteem (feat. Björn "Speed" Strid) – 2017
 Starved of Guidance – 2017
 Suicidal Angel – 2017

References

External links 
 

Spanish death metal musical groups
Spanish melodic death metal musical groups
Spanish alternative metal musical groups
Groove metal musical groups
Musical groups established in 2008
Musical quintets
Norse mythology in music